Dycladia correbioides is a moth of the subfamily Arctiinae. It was described by Felder in 1869. It is found in Mexico, Guatemala, Costa Rica, Panama and Colombia.

References

Euchromiina
Moths described in 1869